The 2007 Eurocup Mégane Trophy season was the third season of the Renault–supported touring car category, a one-make racing series that is part of the World Series by Renault. The season began at Circuit Zolder on 21 April and finished at the Circuit de Catalunya on 28 October, after seven rounds and fourteen races. Pedro Petiz won the title, having battled with his team-mate Dimitri Enjalbert for the entire campaign.

Teams and drivers

Race calendar and results

Standings

Drivers' Championship

Notes

References

External links
The Eurocup Mégane Trophy website
World Series by Renault results

Eurocup Mégane Trophy seasons
Eurocup Megane Trophy